Francis Gregory Delleney, Jr. (born February 9, 1952) is an American politician. He is a member of the South Carolina House of Representatives from the 43rd District, serving since 1991. He is a member of the Republican party.

References

Living people
1952 births
Republican Party members of the South Carolina House of Representatives
21st-century American politicians